Chaourse is a commune in the Aisne department in Hauts-de-France in northern France. The famous Chaourse Treasure of Roman artefacts, now in the British Museum, was found in the village in 1883.

Population

See also
Communes of the Aisne department

References

Communes of Aisne
Aisne communes articles needing translation from French Wikipedia